is a professional Japanese baseball player.

External links

 NPB.com

1976 births
Living people
Japanese baseball players
Nippon Professional Baseball pitchers
Fukuoka Daiei Hawks players
Fukuoka SoftBank Hawks players
Yokohama BayStars players
Yokohama DeNA BayStars players
Japanese baseball coaches
Nippon Professional Baseball coaches
Baseball people from Fukuoka (city)